Kaien Island is a Canadian island on the coast of British Columbia, just north of the mouth of the Skeena River and to the south of the Alaska Panhandle. The island consists of a central mountain ridge, surrounded by coastal lowlands, the dominant central peak is Mount Hays reaching , with a secondary peak, Mount Olfield reaching  to the northeast.

Located within the Hecate Depression of the Coastal Trough, Kaien Island is a subdivision of the Coast Mountains geomorphic region. The island's bedrock consists of metasedimentary amphibolite, which dips towards the east at about 35 degrees. The island is contained within the Skeena-Queen Charlotte Regional District and are part of the North Coast region. Tidal waters surrounding the island have a wide range which results in extensive exposure of mud flats and rock shoals that are prime habitat for invertebrates and intertidal fish.

Kaien Island is central to the traditional territories of the Tsimshian First Nations, and has been permanently settled for more than 5,000 years. The city of Prince Rupert, British Columbia is situated on the island. Casey Point is located on the western extremity of the island, facing Digby Island, was the site of one of the coastal defence installations to protect the BC Coast during World War II.  Another such installation was at Seal Cove on the island's northern tip.

See also
Prince Rupert Harbour

References

Images 

Islands of British Columbia
North Coast of British Columbia
Prince Rupert, British Columbia